Sarbeswar Bhoi is an Indian folksinger from Kalahandi, India of Sambalpuri folk music. He sang songs such as "Likri Jhkri' and "Lal Jhara Jhara" for the Sambalpuri movie Aadim Vichar, which won National Award for Best Feature Film in Odia Category in 2014.

Early life
He was born in a Hindu Gouda (Yadav) family of Rekhpur village in Kalahandi District to Purusottam Bhoi and Pana Bhoi. His father is a farmer. He studied at Narla Panchyatsamiti High School. He enrolled in Madnpaur Rampur College and graduated from the Government Autonomous College in Bhawanipatna.

His career started while he was pursuing his degree. He participated in the Mahavid Sanskrutika Anusthan singing competition in 2002 and won first prize. He started learning Odissi from Guru Karunakar Dash in 2006 and four years later, he trained under Guru Santosh Kumar Das.

Career

His first break came in 2006. He recorded ″″Pakhanupare Jharana Paani″″ with Subham Music and it made him a star. He sang "Likri Jhikri", "Lal Jhara Jhara" for the National Award-winning movie Aadim Vichar in 2014.

Accolades
He received Ustad Bismillah Khan Yuva Puraskar 2017 for his contribution to the Sambalpuri Folk Dance and music from Sangeet Natak Akademi.

References

Living people
Indian folk singers
Singers from Odisha
Year of birth missing (living people)
People from Kalahandi district